The LiMAx test (maximum liver function capacity) is a dynamic liver function test based on the metabolism of 13C-methacetin by the liver-specific cytochrome P450 1A2 system. The test can be carried out at bedside displaying actual liver function at the point of measurement (Point-of-care testing).

Test principle 
The LiMAx test is an innovative enzymatic liver function test. 13C-methacetin, a selective metabolite of the liver specific cytochrome P450 1A2  is administered intravenously. Via the bloodstream the drug is transported to the liver and immediately metabolized to paracetamol and ultimately to 13CO2 (Fig. 1), which is in turn transported via the bloodstream to the lung and exhaled.

Cytochrome P450 1A2 is evenly distributed over all the cells of a liver acinus, and is in contrast to other members of the cytochrome P450 family exclusively expressed in the liver. Cytochrome  P450 A2 is usually not inducible by clinically frequently used drugs making it ideal even in complex clinical situations (exceptions are oral contraceptives resulting in a strong induction of P450 A2). Nutrition and lifestyle can strongly influence P450 A2 induction e.g. smoking or coffee consumption.
The test substance 13C methacetin itself is considered as is non-toxic and very well tolerated in the used dosage. Similarly, 13C is a stable, naturally occurring and non-radioactive carbon isotope. For this reason, patients need to fast for at least three hours before measurement to remove potential interferences with carbon from the food.

Test procedure 
The test is started with placing a breathing mask on the patient's face, separating the inhaled from the exhaled air by two valves. Consequently, the ratio of the  13CO2/12CO2 is determined in the exhaled air over a period of 10 to 20 minutes to measure the individual baseline of each patient (Fig. 2).
After intravenous injection of 13C-methacetin the ratio of 13CO2/12CO2 increases subsequently and is quantified by a special device continuously and realtime at the bedside (FLIP). Since the device is detecting the carbon dioxide ratio chronic lung diseases (e.g. COPD, fibrosis) do not influence test results. The turnover of 13C-methacetin can be continuously determined using kinetic analysis. The LiMAx (maximum liver function capacity) is defined as the maximum value of the substrate conversion normalized to body weight.

Clinical application 
The LiMAx test was developed at Charité University Hospital Berlin and is deployed in German, Austrian and Swiss university hospitals gaining widespread use in hepatology and liver surgery. Stockmann et al. could show that LiMAx is an excellent predictor of postoperative liver failure after partial hepatic resection. Moreover, Lock et al. showed that the onset and course of liver regeneration after liver surgery could be validly displayed using LiMAx. In the context of liver transplantation LiMAx demonstrated high diagnostic accuracy in detecting early transplant dysfunction or non-function of liver grafts allowing an appropriate clinical management.

Similarly, present liver cirrhosis can be diagnosed adequately by means of the LiMAx test and graded according to the functional impairment. Present research on LiMAx test  addresses the non-invasive diagnosis of liver cirrhosis, the influence of chemotherapy on liver function and liver function adapted drug therapy as well as other issues in hepatology and surgery.

References 

Breath tests
Hepatology